Mount Balchen is a prominent peak, 3,085 m, standing 6 nautical miles (11 km) east of the summit of Mount Fridtjof Nansen, in the Herbert Range, Queen Maud Mountains. Named by the Southern Party of the New Zealand Geological Survey Antarctic Expedition (NZGSAE) (1961–62) for Bernt Balchen, pilot with Roald Amundsen on Arctic flights, and with Rear Admiral Richard E. Byrd on his South Pole flight of 1929.

Mountains of the Ross Dependency
Amundsen Coast